The 2022 American Athletic Conference men's soccer season was the 10th season of men's varsity soccer in the American Athletic Conference (The American).  The season culminated with the 2022 American Athletic Conference Men's Soccer Tournament.

Background

Previous season

Tulsa was the regular season champions, earning their first regular season title since 2009. The Golden Hurricane also completed the double by winning the 2021 American Athletic Conference Men's Soccer Tournament, making it their first tournament title since 2016. The Golden Hurricane earned the conference's automatic berth into the 2021 NCAA Division I Men's Soccer Tournament. Tulsa earned a national seed (the 6th overall seed) and reached the third round (Sweet Sixteen) before losing to West Virginia in overtime.

Two players from the American were selected in the third round of the 2022 MLS SuperDraft. SMU's Skage Simonsen was selected by D.C. United with the 69th overall pick and UCF's Nick Taylor was selected  by Orlando City with the 74th overall pick. Additionally, Yanis Leerman of UCF was also drafted.

Program changes
On May 4, 2022, American Conference commissioner Mike Aresco announced the addition of affiliate member institutions (UAB, Florida Atlantic, FIU and Charlotte) for men's soccer beginning in the fall 2022 season. All of these schools except FIU will become full members of The American on July 1, 2023.

Teams

Stadiums and Locations

Head coaches 
Note: All stats current through the completion of the 2021 season

Preseason

Recruiting classes

Preseason Coaches polls
The 2022 AAC Preseason Poll was released on August 23, 2022. The league's head coaches ranked Tulsa as the preseason favorite, with a unanimous 9 first place votes. Full results of the poll are shown below:

Preseason awards

All−American Teams

Preseason All AAC

First Team

Second Team

All AAC Honorable Mention (received votes from four or more members of the media): 
Charlotte: 
Florida Atlantic:
FIU:
Memphis:
SMU:
South Florida:
Temple:
Tulane:
UAB:
UCF:

Preseason exhibitions

Regular Season 

All times Eastern time.

Week 1 (Aug. 25 – Aug. 29)

Players of the Week

Week 2 (Aug. 30 – Sep. 5) 

Players of the Week

Week 3 (Sep. 6 – Sep. 12)

Players of the Week

Week 4 (Sep. 13 – Sep. 19) 

Players of the Week

Week 5 (Sep. 20 – Sep. 26) 

Players of the Week

Week 6 (Sep. 27 – Oct. 3) 

Players of the Week

Week 7 (Oct. 4 – Oct. 10) 

Players of the Week

Week 8 (Oct. 11 – Oct. 17) 

Players of the Week

Week 9 (Oct. 18 – Oct. 24) 

Players of the Week

Week 10 (Oct. 25 – Nov. 2) 

Players of the Week

Rankings

National rankings

Regional rankings - USC East Region 

The United Soccer Coaches' East region ranks teams across the American Athletic, Big East, and MAAC.

Awards and honors

Postseason honors

References

External links
 The American Men's Soccer

 
2022 NCAA Division I men's soccer season